The Revolutionary Socialist Action Organization was a short-lived Lebanese political party, a sister organization of the Palestinian PFLP-GC.

References

Socialist parties in Lebanon